Strigatella aurantia (common name: orange mitre) is a species of sea snail, a marine gastropod mollusk in the family Mitridae, the miters or miter snails.

Description
The adult shell size varies between 21 mm and 58 mm

Distribution
This species occurs in the Red Sea, in the Indian Ocean at Mozambique, and in the Pacific Ocean at Papua New Guinea and the Solomons.

References

 MacNae, W. & M. Kalk (eds) (1958). A natural history of Inhaca Island, Mozambique. Witwatersrand Univ. Press, Johannesburg. I-iv, 163 pp
 Cernohorsky W. O. (1976). The Mitrinae of the World. Indo-Pacific Mollusca 3(17) page(s): 425
 Vine, P. (1986). Red Sea Invertebrates. Immel Publishing, London. 224 pp

External links
 Gmelin J.F. (1791). Vermes. In: Gmelin J.F. (Ed.) Caroli a Linnaei Systema Naturae per Regna Tria Naturae, Ed. 13. Tome 1(6). G.E. Beer, Lipsiae (Leipzig). pp. 3021–3910
 Reeve, L. A. (1844–1845). Monograph of the genus Mitra. In: Conchologia Iconica, or, illustrations of the shells of molluscous animals, vol. 2, pl. 1–39 and unpaginated text. L. Reeve & Co., London.
  Röding, P.F. (1798). Museum Boltenianum sive Catalogus cimeliorum e tribus regnis naturæ quæ olim collegerat Joa. Fried Bolten, M. D. p. d. per XL. annos proto physicus Hamburgensis. Pars secunda continens Conchylia sive Testacea univalvia, bivalvia & multivalvia. Trapp, Hamburg. viii, 199 pp
 Fedosov A., Puillandre N., Herrmann M., Kantor Yu., Oliverio M., Dgebuadze P., Modica M.V. & Bouchet P. (2018). The collapse of Mitra: molecular systematics and morphology of the Mitridae (Gastropoda: Neogastropoda). Zoological Journal of the Linnean Society. 183(2): 253–337

Mitridae
Gastropods described in 1791